Gagik Rafik Karapetyan (born December 2, 1957), is an Armenian physical therapist, poet, academician and a full member of Medico Technical Academy of Science of Russian Federation.

Biography
Karapetyan was born on December 2, 1957 in Leninakan (now Gyumri). Horoscope signs are archer-Cock. He has graduated from two Institutions in Yerevan and one in the United States, Specialization of teacher-coach; psychologist-physiotherapist and physiotherapist-manualist.

He studied and graduated from USSR Academy of Medical Sciences at first, post graduate study and then doctor study. He is an academician and a full member of Medico Technical Academy of Science of Russian Federation.

Together with his working team Gagik Karapetyan provides 2500-3000 medical sessions with 300-350 clients annually. He has spread his activity in Moscow, Stambul, Paris, Mexico, Dubai, Los Angeles and has visited different countries on business trips.

Literary career
Gagik Karapetyan is also acknowledged for his literary activities. He is the author of over a hundred scientific works, three thousand radio and TV shows, two novels including the poem “The Hell” which is devoted to the victims of 1988 December 7 earthquake. The poem became a part of the National Radio “Gold Fund” performed by People’s artist, the master of recitation Vladimir Abajyan.

Poetry 
 Love and Resentment
 The Hell
 A Meeting
 Gugo

Awards
Gagik Karapetyan is awarded the Medal of Chizhevsky by the Medico Technical Academy of Science of Russian Federation.

References

External links
 Gagik Karapetyan's official website
 Gagik Karapetyan's biography in doctors.am website
 Gagik Karapetyan's contacts at med-practic.com website

Armenian people in health professions
20th-century Armenian poets
1957 births
Living people
Armenian male poets
People from Gyumri
20th-century male writers